Carlos Eduardo Claverie Borgiani (born 19 September 1996) is a Venezuelan swimmer. He won two silver and one bronze medal at the 2014 Summer Youth Olympics. He competed in the men's 100 metre breaststroke event at the 2016 Summer Olympics.

References

External links
 

1996 births
Living people
Venezuelan male swimmers
Olympic swimmers of Venezuela
Swimmers at the 2016 Summer Olympics
Swimmers at the 2014 Summer Youth Olympics
Swimmers at the 2011 Pan American Games
Swimmers at the 2015 Pan American Games
Swimmers at the 2019 Pan American Games
Central American and Caribbean Games medalists in swimming
Central American and Caribbean Games gold medalists for Venezuela
Competitors at the 2014 Central American and Caribbean Games
Male breaststroke swimmers
Pan American Games competitors for Venezuela
20th-century Venezuelan people
21st-century Venezuelan people